The Casmalia Hills are a mountain range in the Transverse Ranges, in western Santa Barbara County, California.

References 

Mountain ranges of Santa Barbara County, California
Transverse Ranges
Hills of California
Mountain ranges of Southern California